Tall Koshi (also Romanized as Tall Koshī and Tall Keshī; also known as Gāl-e Bedeh, Qolleh Keshī, Tall Kīshī, and Toleh Keshī) is a village in Emad Deh Rural District, Sahray-ye Bagh District, Larestan County, Fars Province, Iran. At the 2006 census, its population was 125, in 29 families.

References 

Populated places in Larestan County